This is a list of the last executions in the United States for the crimes stated.

List of last persons to be executed for a crime other than murder

Statistics 
From 1930 to 1967, 3859 criminals were executed, sorted in the following table:

See also 

 Capital punishment in the United States

Notes and references

Notes

References 

Lists of people executed in the United States